Tricholoma permelleum is an agaric fungus of the genus Tricholoma. It is found in Peninsular Malaysia, where it fruits on soil, fallen trunks, and bamboo stumps. It was described as new to science in 1994 by English mycologist E.J.H. Corner.

See also
List of Tricholoma species

References

permelleum
Fungi described in 1994
Fungi of Asia
Taxa named by E. J. H. Corner